Progonica rhothias is a species of moth of the family Oecophoridae. It is found in Australia.

References

Hypertrophinae
Moths of Australia